Jim Denning (born August 13, 1956), is a former Republican member of the Kansas Senate, representing the 8th district from 2013 to 2021.

Early life 
On August 13, 1956, Denning was born in Great Bend, Kansas. Denning's father was Paul Denning, an oil field worker. Denning's mother was Albertine Denning. Denning was the sixth of nine siblings.

Education 
In 1980, Denning earned a B.A. degree in Finance from Fort Hays State University.

Career 
In 2010, Denning began to serve the Kansas House of Representatives, having defeated incumbent Democrat Dolores Furtado and representing District 19 from 2011 to 2013. Denning was succeeded by Republican Stephanie Clayton. He was first elected to the state Senate in 2012, with support from Governor Sam Brownback, the health care industry and the Koch brothers, defeating moderate Republican incumbent Tim Owens and was re-elected to the Senate in 2016.  On December 5, 2016, Denning was elected as the Senate Majority Leader. The American Conservative Union gave him a lifetime evaluation of 79%. In 2020, he worked with Democratic Governor Laura Kelly to craft a bipartisan Medicaid expansion plan. He said Wagle's tactics were crafted "without my input" nor did they reflect his plans, continuing, "Her statements are obstructive and not how we should be governing."

He did not seek re-election in 2020.

Personal life 
Denning's wife is Marearl Denning. They have two children.

Denning's brother Frank was the elected sheriff of Johnson County, Kansas for thirteen years, before retiring in 2017.

References

External links 
State Page
Campaign Website
Midwest Democracy
Ballotpedia
Votesmart

1956 births
21st-century American politicians
Fort Hays State University alumni
Republican Party Kansas state senators
Living people
Republican Party members of the Kansas House of Representatives
People from Great Bend, Kansas